Russian Government Cup was a tournament for national teams in bandy, arranged in Russia every other year from 1972 until 2012. The cup has not been played since 2012.

When the Bandy World Championships were held every other year, this tournament was held in around the same time of the year (February/March) in the years when there was no World Championships. Starting in 2003, it was arranged in December instead.

History
Besides the national teams, there have sometimes been irregular teams representing federation subjects of Russia (earlier the USSR) or a "Russia no. 2" team – these are written with italics below and marked with two flags if they are federation subjects – or Russian club teams, to fill out the tournament. Youth national teams have also occationally been invited.

It was called the Rossiya Tournament until 1990, because it was arranged by the newspaper Sovetskaya Rossiya. Since then, it was instead being arranged by the Russian government, hence the latter name.

Tournaments

References

 
International bandy competitions hosted by Russia
International bandy competitions hosted by the Soviet Union
1972 establishments in Russia
Recurring sporting events established in 1972
Recurring sporting events disestablished in 2012
2012 disestablishments in Russia